Dr. Rizvi Learners' Academy  is a private co-educational senior secondary school in Jaunpur, Uttar Pradesh, India that was established in 1995. It is managed by Dr. Akhtar Hasan Rizvi Educational Trust and affiliated to the Central Board of Secondary Education (CBSE).

References

External links
 

Private schools in Uttar Pradesh
Primary schools in Uttar Pradesh
High schools and secondary schools in Uttar Pradesh
Jaunpur district
Educational institutions established in 1995
1995 establishments in Uttar Pradesh